Buju may refer to:

Buju, Iran (disambiguation)
Jewish Buddhist
Buju Banton, Jamaican reggae dancehall musician
Bnxn, Nigerian Singer